Cannara is a town and comune on the Topino River in the floodplain of central Umbria, in the province of Perugia. It is located about 7 km west of Spello and 9 km north of Bevagna.

It is a low-key agricultural village: its main business is the growing of wheat and onions. Its railroad station is used for freight and does not serve passengers.

As indicated by the etymology of the name (from canna, rushes), it is a medieval town, recent by the standards of the region, since in earlier times the site was underwater in the Lacus Clitorius that covered much of the area between Bastia Umbra and Foligno, and was only drained in the Middle Ages. At any rate Cannara is first mentioned in 1170 as insula Cannaio — "the island of Cannaio"; the lake had not been completely drained yet.

Main sights
Its principal monuments consist in a number of small churches, among which the most important is probably the Church of the Buona Morte (also known as the Church of the Stigmata of St. Francis), which may be associated with the foundation of the Third Order by St. Francis of Assisi.

In the territory of the comune, a shrine at Pian d'Arca commemorates the Miracle of the Birds of the same St. Francis; and the little hilltop town of Collemancio has two old churches and a ruined Roman settlement identified by some with Urbinum Hortense.

Local events
Cannara's main annual celebration is a Sagra in honor of the onion: the Festa della Cipolla. The week-long festival, featuring onion-based dining al fresco, draws over 10,000 visitors and is one of the best of the Umbrian sagre.

References

External links
Official website
Thayer's Gazetteer of Umbria

Cities and towns in Umbria